Tishkov is a Russian surname. Notable people with the surname include:

 Valery Tishkov (born 1941), Soviet and Russian ethnologist
 Yuri Tishkov (1971–2003), Soviet and Russian footballer, agent, and commentator

Russian-language surnames